Jessica Christina Therese Thunander, (born 25 November 1973 in Gothenburg) is a Swedish politician for the Left Party and a member of the Riksdagen for 2018–2022. There she represents Västra Götaland County East constituency. Thunander grew up and lives in Falköping, before becoming a politician she worked as a teacher in Swedish. She has also worked for the railway SJ.

References

External links 

Living people
1973 births
Swedish politicians
People from Gothenburg
Members of the Riksdag 2018–2022
Members of the Riksdag from the Left Party (Sweden)